Dads (stylized as dads) is an American live-action sitcom created by Wellesley Wild and Alec Sulkin for Fox. The series follows Warner and Eli, two successful video game developers whose lives are unexpectedly changed when their respective fathers move in with them. Sulkin and Wild are also executive producers. The show was recorded in front of a live studio audience. Dads was a joint production by Fuzzy Door Productions and 20th Century Fox Television and was syndicated by 20th Television.

Cast and characters
 Seth Green as Eli Sachs, Warner's business partner. He is portrayed as the "creative" end of the video game business. While Warner is often seen in a tie, Eli generally wears T-shirts and sweatshirts. He is a lothario and is often made fun of when he fails to have sex with women. He maintains a flirtatious relationship with his assistant Veronica. Eli also maintains a tumultuous relationship with his father David, who he feels eats all his food and stinks up his bathroom. He is also seemingly very fond of his maid, Edna, as a surrogate mother.
 Giovanni Ribisi as Warner Whittemore, Eli's business partner. He is often portrayed to be the "business" end of the video game business. He often loses control of his emotions and maintains an estranged relationship with his wife, Camilla. He has two children with Camilla. It is revealed in episode "Double Troubles" that he is afraid of sex. His father is Crawford who often inadvertently gets Warner into awkward situations. His best friend is Eli, but they can both get into conflicts over various subjects.
 Peter Riegert as David Sachs, Eli's dad. He left Eli as a child and returns to live in Eli's apartment where he is generally seen sitting on the couch, eating, watching television, or fighting with Edna. A recurring joke in the series is his intestinal problems. He is lethargic, sardonic, cold, and grumpy towards most characters, but has a friendship with Crawford. David seemingly does not care for Eli, but is shown that he is supportive for his son, such as stealing comic books for Eli, marrying Edna to keep her from being deported, and taking a job as a mall Santa to buy Eli a Christmas present. As revealed in "Have a Heart... Attack", he is 65 years old.
 Martin Mull as Crawford Whittemore, Warner's dad. He is portrayed as a failed businessman, but continues to try to launch his career. A recurring joke in the series is his bad investments. He often means well toward his son, but ends up ruining his life in the same way. Crawford is prone to racial slurs, which he appears not to notice to be racist.
 Brenda Song as Veronica, Eli's and Warner's assistant. She is a sarcastic and cunning person, as shown when she gives herself a raise without her bosses' permission. She is proven to be tricky as she manages to outsmart Eli and Warner into jumping into a chimney. She works closely with both Eli and Warner, but has a closer relationship with Eli. Her ethnicity is often made fun of by other characters, as Eli teases her for having a cousin named "Wai Mi" (pronounced like the English words "why me?"). In the episode "The Glitch that Stole Christmas", it is revealed she only drinks alcohol once a year.
 Tonita Castro as Edna, Eli's maid. She is Mexican and an illegal immigrant. She is the constant rival and friend of David, Eli's dad. In the episode "Doubles Trouble", it is revealed that she is an expert of Virtual Table Tennis. In the episode "Mister Edna", Edna is nearly deported. David marries her to avoid deportation and promptly divorces her. She often speaks Spanish throughout the show.
 Vanessa Lachey as Camilla Whittemore, Warner's wife. She acts as the person to calm Warner down through his many emotional outbreaks. She often tries to get Warner to do new things. In the episode "Comic Book Issues", it is revealed that she never farts in front of Warner. She has two children with Warner.

Development and production

The series first appeared as part of Fox development slate in September 2012. In January 2013, Fox bypassed the pilot order and green-lit Dads with a six-episode, straight-to-series order. The pilot was directed by Mark Cendrowski and written by Alec Sulkin and Wellesley Wild, who also serve as executive producers alongside Seth MacFarlane. In May 2013, Fox extended the episode order from six to thirteen episodes. In October 2013, the network ordered six more scripts of the series. Later that same month, Dads was picked up for a full season with nine episodes. On December 6, 2013, Fox trimmed the series' first season from 22 to 19 episodes.

Casting
Casting announcements began in January 2013, with Brenda Song first to be cast in the role of Veronica, Warner and Eli's odd assistant. Tommy Dewey was the next actor cast in the series as Warner, Eli's work partner and married father of two, whose father Crawford moves in with him. Peter Riegert was then added to the cast in the role of David, Eli's father, who abandoned Eli and his mother when he was five, and is now trying to rebuild their relationship. In mid-March, Martin Mull joined the series as Crawford, Warner's father, a man who's always been the bane of Warner's existence. Tonita Castro followed in the role of Edna, Eli's hard-drinking, outspoken maid. Seth Green and Erin Pineda were the last actors cast in the series. Green signed on to play the remaining lead role of Eli, a man who hasn't grown up but who built a successful video game business with Warner. Pineda joined the series as Camilla, Warner's wife with whom he has a four-year-old son and one-year-old daughter. In late March, it was announced that Vanessa Lachey would replace Erin Pineda in the role of Warner's wife, Camilla. In April, Giovanni Ribisi replaced Tommy Dewey as Warner after the taping of the pilot.

Cancellation
On May 7, 2014, Fox canceled the series after one season before the final episode aired on July 16, 2014.

Reception

Critical reception
Dads was universally panned by critics. It holds a score of 15 out of 100 on review aggregator Metacritic, based on 28 critics, indicating "overwhelming dislike". It also holds a rare 0% rating on review aggregator Rotten Tomatoes, where the consensus reads, "A near-total disaster, Dads makes the fatal mistake of believing its racist gags can lend an edge to its aggressively predictable writing and unlikable characters."

Ratings
Dads premiered to a 2.2 rating in the key Adults 18-49 demographic. In week two, it fell about 32% to a 1.5 rating.

These results were viewed by experts as mediocre. At television ratings analysis website TV by the Numbers, Dads premiered at On the Bubble on the Bubble Watch and had a de facto canceled status on the Renew/Cancel Index, until it was cancelled on May 7, 2014.

DVD release
On November 11, 2014, Olive Films released the entire series on DVD.

Broadcast
The series premiered in Australia on Eleven on May 18, 2014.

Episodes

See also
 2013–14 United States network television schedule

References

External links
 
 

2013 American television series debuts
2014 American television series endings
2010s American sitcoms
English-language television shows
Fox Broadcasting Company original programming
Television series about families
Television series by 20th Century Fox Television
Television series by Fuzzy Door Productions
Television shows set in San Francisco